Kaasen is a Norwegian surname. Notable people with the surname include:

Gunnar Kaasen (1882–1960), Norwegian musher
Knut Kaasen (born 1951), Norwegian legal scholar
Paal Kaasen (1883–1963), Norwegian sailor 

Surnames of Norwegian origin